Our Mutual Girl is a 1914 American film serial shown in weekly installments, starring Norma Phillips. It was created by Mutual Film to be an alternative to "stunt-driven, wild-animal wrestling" serials such as The Perils of Pauline.

Our Mutual Girl ran for 52 weekly installments. Most installments featured cameos by notable figures from the worlds of politics, sports, entertainment, business and art. The serial was "provided free to exhibitors as the figurehead for the Mutual program of one-reel, two-reel and serial films, forming a trademark for the exchange as a whole." It is an example of early national advertising that was specifically targeted to women consumers.

Plot
Margaret, known as "our Mutual girl," travels from the country to New York City to stay with her wealthy aunt. Over the course of the serial, she is transformed into a "society belle," introduced to notable society figures, and taught how to dress and act to fit into her aunt's world.

Cast
Norma Phillips as Margaret, our Mutual girl
J. W. Johnston as Jack Stuyvescent
Grace Fisher as Aunt Abbie
Mayme Kelso as Mrs. James Knickerbocker
Madge Tyrone as Travers’ sister 
Evelyn Dumo as Margaret's maid
Jessie Lewis as Lewis, Mrs. Knickerbocker's maid
James Alling as Mrs. Knickerbocker's butler
Edward Brennan as Howard Dunbar

Notable cameo appearances

References

External links 
 
 

1914 films
American silent serial films
1910s American films